USS Richard Peck (IX-96) was an auxiliary ship of the United States Navy during 1943. Built in 1892 by Harlan and Hollingsworth, Wilmington, Delaware, she was acquired by the Navy on 20 February 1943, from the New England Steamship Company, New Haven, Connecticut, and commissioned the same day at Argentia, Newfoundland.

Richard Peck provided electrical power at Argentia during her active service. Decommissioned on 5 November 1943, at Norfolk, Virginia, she was struck from the Navy List on 16 November 1943, transferred to the War Shipping Administration on 9 December 1943, and subsequently transferred to the Pennsylvania Railroad.

References 
 

Unclassified miscellaneous vessels of the United States Navy
Ships built by Harlan and Hollingsworth
1892 ships